Fizzyology is the first collaboration album from Termanology and M.O.P. member Lil' Fame. It was released on November 6, 2012 on Brick Records. Guest appearances by Bun B, Freeway, Busta Rhymes, Styles P, Lee Wilson, and Kira. Fizzy Womack produced the majority of the songs with the help of DJ Premier, The Alchemist, Statik Selektah, and J-Waxx Garfield.

Track listing

Samples
"Fizzyology" contains a sample of "I Forgot To Be Your Lover" by The Mad Lads.
"Hustler's Ringtone" contains samples of "Addicted to Your Love" by Muscle Shoals Horns and "Poisonous Products" by Boogie Down Productions.
"From The Streets" contains a sample of "Ante Up (Robbin-Hoodz Theory)" by M.O.P.
"Play Dirty" contains samples of "Get It On the Floor" by DMX and "Memory Lane (Sittin' In Da Park)" by Nas.
"Too Tough for TV" contains samples of "Trouble Man" by Marvin Gaye and "Who Shot Ya?" by The Notorious B.I.G.
"Pray For Me" contains a sample of "Mystery" by Anita Baker.
"Not by You" contains a sample of "We Can Make It Happen Again" by The Stylistics.
"Family Ties" contains a sample of "Baby Baby Don't Cry" by Smokey Robinson & the Miracles.
"Thuggathon" contains a sample of "Here We Are" by Churchill.

References

2012 albums
Termanology albums
Albums produced by DJ Premier
Albums produced by the Alchemist (musician)
Albums produced by Statik Selektah